The PLW New England Championship is a professional wrestling championship in Power League Wrestling (PLW). It is the second most important championship in the promotion, after the PLW Heavyweight Championship.

Overall, there have been 34 reigns shared between 29 wrestlers with eleven vacancies. The inaugural champion was Scott Z., who defeated "Ruthless" Ryan Amaral in a tournament final on December 16, 1991 to become the first PLW New England Champion. Maniacal Mark holds the record for most reigns, with three. At 966 days, Nicholas Night's first and only reign is the longest in the title's history. Shane Simons's only reign was the shortest in the history of the title holding it for only 35 days. Only four men in history have held the championship for a continuous reign of one year (365 days) or more. They are Scott Thomas, Nicholas Night, Eric Dylan, and Keanu.

Title history
Key

Reigns
As of January 1, 2016

List of combined reigns
As of April 22, 2016.

References
General

Specific

External links
PowerLeagueWrestling.com
PLW New England Championship at Cagematch.net
PLW New England Championship at Wrestlingdata.com

United States regional professional wrestling championships